Rood is a Dutch surname. Meaning "red", it often originally referred to a person with red hair. The name can also be toponymic, since in Middle Dutch "rood" or "rode" was a name for a cleared area in the woods. Among variant forms are De Rood(e), Roode, Roodt and 'Van Rood. The name can also be of English toponymic origin, referring to someone living near a rood ("cross"). Notable people with the surname include:

Anson Rood (1827–1898), American businessman and Wisconsin politician
Davenport Rood (fl. 1840s), American carpenter and Wisconsin councilman
Denise Rood (born 1955), American violinist
Grace Alexandra Rood (1893–1981), New Zealand school dental nurse
Harold W. Rood (1922–2011), American political scientist
John Rood (born 1968), American businessman, Under Secretary of Defense for Policy since 2018
John D. Rood (born 1955), American businessman, Ambassador to the Bahamas from 2004 to 2007
Jon van Rood (1926–2017), Dutch immunologist
 (born 1955), Dutch screenwriter, film director and philosopher
Katie Rood (born 1992), New Zealand football forward
Mary Rood, British silversmith
Max Rood (1927–2001), Dutch legal scholar and D66 politician
Ogden Rood (1831–1902), American physicist and color theorist
Richard Rood (violinist) (born 1955), American violinist
Richard B. Rood (born c. 1955), American climatologist
Richard E. Rood, better known as Rick Rude (1958–1999), American professional wrestler
Ronald Rood (1920–2001), American author, naturalist and radio commentator
Theoderic Rood (fl. 1470s), English printer
Tim Rood (born 1960s), British classical scholar
Variant spellings
Bobby Roode (born 1977), Canadian professional wrestler
Dan Roodt (born 1967), Afrikaner author, publisher, and commentator
Darrell Roodt (born 1962), South African film director, screenwriter and producer
Dewald Roode (1940–2009), South African computer scientist and information systems researcher
Hendrik Roodt (born 1987), South African rugby player
Middle names derived from the surname
Charles Rood Keeran (1883–1948), American (Illinois) inventor and businessman
James Rood Doolittle (1815–1897), American politician, US Senator from Wisconsin 1857–69
John Rood Cunningham (1891–1980), American college president

References

Dutch-language surnames
English-language surnames
Surnames from nicknames